Muharrem Karriqi (born in Kavajë) is a retired Albanian footballer who played most of his professional career as playmaker for Besa Kavajë football club during the 1970s. He is widely considered as the most talented midfielder in club history.

He won a league title with Partizani.

Honours
Albanian Superliga: 1
 1979

References

Year of birth missing (living people)
Living people
Footballers from Kavajë
Albanian footballers
Association football midfielders
Besa Kavajë players
FK Partizani Tirana players